Donald Bruce Callander (1930–2008) was an American fantasy novel author, photographer, editor and graphic artist.  He authored Pyromancer, a tale of young wizard-in-training Douglas Brightglade, and fourteen other novels.

Personal

Born in Minnesota, Callander joined the U.S. Navy after high school, serving four years of active duty during the Korean War, and then 20 years in the U.S. Naval Reserve. In 1952, Callander married Mary Lee Omohundro and moved to Washington, D.C., where he began a 30-year career as a writer, photographer, editor and graphic artist with the American Automobile Association.

Following his retirement, Callander settled with his second wife, Margaret, in Orange City, Florida, where he died on Friday, July 25, 2008.

Books
(All books published/reissued by Mundania Press  2013/2014)
Teddybear, Teddybear (2014)
Star Warrior (2014)
The Last Cruise of the USS Pocahontas (2014)

Mancer series
Pyromancer (1992)
Aquamancer (1993)
Geomancer (1994)
Aeromancer (1997)
Marbleheart (1998)
The Reluctant Knight (2014)

Dragon Companion series
Dragon Companion (1994)
Dragon Rescue (1995)
Dragon Tempest (1998)
Dragon Winter (2014)

Warlock series
Warlock's Bar & Grille (2000)
Warlock's All & Sundry (2014)

References

External links

1930 births
2008 deaths
20th-century American novelists
American fantasy writers
American male novelists
People from Minnesota
20th-century American male writers